"Ai no Kotoba" is a single by Hitomi and her last single released from her album Love Concent. Overall, this is Hitomi's 32nd single released throughout her career.

Overview
The lyrics for "Ai no Kotoba" were written by Hitomi herself while the lyrics for "Arittake no Ai", the b-side of this single, were written by Taiji Sato. "Arittake no Ai" is a cover and was originally performed by Theatre Brook in 2000. To date, this has been Hitomi's 2nd lowest selling single, with her first being her debut single "Let's Play Winter". Though, the main reason why this single performed so poorly is because Love Concent, the album this song is included on, was to be released only 2 weeks afterward.
In English, "Ai no Kotoba" means "Words of Love".

Track listing

Live performances
 September 2, 2006 – Music Fair 21
 September 15, 2006 – PopJam DX

Charts
Oricon Sales Chart (Japan)

2006 singles
Hitomi songs
2006 songs
Song recordings produced by Zentaro Watanabe